Cala en Bosch, also Cala'n Bosch or Cala en Bosc, is a beach, marina, hotel, and apartment resort on the southwest coast of Menorca, Balearic Islands, Spain, about  south of Ciutadella de Menorca. It is bordered by Son Xoriguer to the east and Cap d'Artrutx, the southwestern point of the island to the west which contains the Lighthouse of Artrutx. There are scuba diving facilities in the area.
Cala en Bosch is described as being "edged by a shoreline of jagged rocks, several coves, and an inlet to a marina in an artificial lake."

Tourism, especially from the British, took off at Cala en Bosch in the 1980s with a dramatic growth of timeshare and self-catering apartments in the area.
The town consists almost entirely of apartments and hotels; the main centre of activity is in the main town of Ciutadella to the north.

Attractions 
Aquarock Waterpark (Menorca)
Goody Goody Park (and Restaurant Bar)

Amusements arcade 
Kiddies Club 
Star Games

Villas
Villa Clariana (Address: 193b Carrer Illa d'Es Porros, 07769 Cala'n Bosch, Spain)

Villas In 2007
Villa Clariana (18 June 2007 – 25 June 2007) (Address: 193b Carrer Illa d'Es Porros, 07769 Cala'n Bosch, Spain)

References

Beaches of Menorca
Seaside resorts in Spain
Populated places in Menorca
Beaches of the Balearic Islands